Liang Jie is the name of:

 Liang Jie (businessman) (梁捷; born 1975), co-founder of UCWeb
 Liang Jie (actress) (梁洁; born 1994)